Dušan Katnić (Serbian Cyrillic: Душан Катнић; born March 3, 1989) is a Serbian professional basketball player who last played for Klik Arilje of the Second League of Serbia.

Professional career
Katnić, who grew up with Play-Off from Užice and Atlas, made his professional debut with Mega Ishrana in the 2005–06 season. In March 2010, he left Mega and signed with Crvena zvezda, playing there for a couple of months. In December 2010, he signed a deal with Oostende.

In July 2013, he signed with Anwil Włocławek. He left them in February 2014, and signed with Radnički Kragujevac for the rest of the season. On December 10, 2014 he signed with KK Igokea.

On July 8, 2015, Katnić signed with the Slovenian club KK Krka. On December 9, 2015, he left Krka and returned to Igokea for the rest of the season.

On 9 March 2017, Katnić signed with the Macedonian club MZT Skopje.

Serbian national team
Katnić was a member of the Serbian junior national teams that won gold medals at the 2007 FIBA Under-19 World Championship and the 2008 FIBA Europe Under-20 Championship.

References

External links
 Dušan Katnić at aba-liga.com
 Dušan Katnić at fiba.com

1989 births
Living people
ABA League players
Basketball League of Serbia players
BBC Monthey players
BC Oostende players
KK Crvena zvezda players
KK Dynamic players
KK Igokea players
KK Krka players
KK Klik Arilje players
KK Mega Basket players
KK MZT Skopje players
KK Radnički Kragujevac (2009–2014) players
KK Włocławek players
Point guards
Serbian expatriate basketball people in Belgium
Serbian expatriate basketball people in Poland
Serbian expatriate basketball people in North Macedonia
Serbian expatriate basketball people in Saudi Arabia
Serbian expatriate basketball people in Slovenia
Serbian expatriate basketball people in Switzerland
Serbian men's basketball players
Sportspeople from Užice